Cleora projecta, the projecta gray or purplish double-lined gray,  is a moth of the  family Geometridae. It is found in eastern North America, including South Carolina.

The wingspan is about 28 mm.

External links
Bug Guide
Images
Moth Guide

Cleora
Moths described in 1860
Moths of North America